Township 2 can refer to:
Township 2, Harper County, Kansas
Township 2, Washington County, Nebraska